EFX may refer to:
 EFX (show), a Las Vegas show
 EFX (album), an album of the show
 Enterprise Framework (EFx), see EFx Factory
 Enerflex Systems, a Canadian company listed as EFX on the Toronto Stock Exchange
 Equifax, a U.S. consumer credit reporting agency listed as EFX on the New York Stock Exchange
 Effects Extension (EFX), a set of digital signal processing extensions for the OpenAL audio API
 .efx, the Everett Efax file format, see List of file formats
 EFX item allocation - a rule for fair allocation of indivisible objects among people with different preferences.

See also
 FX (disambiguation)
 Das EFX, an American hip-hop group